World Series Baseball is a video game developed and published by Sega for the Sega Saturn in 1995.

Gameplay 

World Series Baseball is a version of World Series Baseball.

Development and release 

It was released in 1995 for the Game Gear and Sega Genesis.

Reception 

World Series Baseball for Saturn won the 1995 Game Players award for Best Sports Game.

In 1996, Next Generation listed World Series Baseball as number 48 on their "Top 100 Games of All Time", commenting that, "This is the best-looking and best-playing baseball video of all time."

Reviews
Game Players - Dec, 1995
GameFan Magazine - Nov, 1995
Video Games & Computer Entertainment - Dec, 1995
Game Informer Magazine - Apr, 2000
Mean Machines - Dec, 1995
GamePro - Jan, 1996

Notes

References

External links 
 World Series Baseball at GameFAQs
 World Series Baseball at MobyGames

1995 video games
Sega video games
Sega Saturn games
Sega Saturn-only games
Video games developed in Japan
World Series Baseball video games